Grüüne is a newspaper published in Estonia by the political party Estonian Greens.

It was first published in January 2007. In 2010, it was only published online. By 2013, the last issue has been published in 2011.

Grüüne has a parallel sister newspaper Poljana which is published in Russian.

References

External links 
  

Newspapers published in Estonia
Publications established in 2007
2007 establishments in Estonia